The Kasado class is a class of coastal minesweepers of the Japan Maritime Self-Defense Force.

Development 
During the Pacific War, a large number of mines were laid in the waters near Japan by both Japan and the United States, which greatly hindered shipping including coastal areas at the end of the war, so the need to deal with this was urgent. It was a thing. For this reason, the scavenging force was maintained even while the Imperial Japanese Navy was dismantled after the surrender of Japan, and was taken over by the 2nd Ministry of Demobilization on December 1, 1945. After that, minesweepers were absorbed by the Japan Coast Guard, which was established on August 1, 1952, and transferred to the Coastal Security Force.

Immediately after its inauguration, the guards have been aiming for domestic production of minesweepers. First, in 1953, the Atada-class minesweeper and JDS Yashiro were built with the characteristics of an actual ship experiment. Based on its achievements, this model was designed as the first mass-produced minesweeper after the war. In designing, it was aimed to have the same performance as the US Navy's Bluebird-class minesweeper (operated as a Yamashima-class minesweeper with the donation of four from 1954).

Ships in the class

Citations 

Ships built in Japan
Minesweepers of the Japan Maritime Self-Defense Force